Azhiyanilai is a village in the Aranthangi revenue block of Pudukkottai district, Tamil Nadu, India.

Demographics 

As per the 2001 census, Aliyanilai had a total population of 3485 with 1713 males and 1772 females. Out of the total population, 2072 people were literate.

References

Villages in Pudukkottai district